This is a list of the mammal species recorded in the Northern Mariana Islands. There are seven mammal species in the Northern Mariana Islands, of which one is endangered and one is vulnerable.

The following tags are used to highlight each species' conservation status as assessed by the International Union for Conservation of Nature:

Some species were assessed using an earlier set of criteria. Species assessed using this system have the following instead of near threatened and least concern categories:

Order: Sirenia (manatees and dugongs) 

Sirenia is an order of fully aquatic, herbivorous mammals that inhabit rivers, estuaries, coastal marine waters, swamps, and marine wetlands. All four species are endangered.

Family: Dugongidae
Genus: Dugong
 Dugong, Dugong dugon VU

Order: Chiroptera (bats) 

The bats' most distinguishing feature is that their forelimbs are developed as wings, making them the only mammals capable of flight. Bat species account for about 20% of all mammals.

Family: Pteropodidae (flying foxes, Old World fruit bats)
Subfamily: Pteropodinae
Genus: Pteropus
 Mariana fruit bat, Pteropus mariannus EN

Order: Carnivora (carnivorans) 

There are over 260 species of carnivorans, the majority of which feed primarily on meat. They have a characteristic skull shape and dentition.
Clade Pinnipedia (seals, sea lions and walruses)
Family: Phocidae (earless seals)
Genus: Mirounga
 Northern elephant seal, Mirounga angustirostris LC

Order: Cetacea (whales) 

The order Cetacea includes whales, dolphins and porpoises. They are the mammals most fully adapted to aquatic life with a spindle-shaped nearly hairless body, protected by a thick layer of blubber, and forelimbs and tail modified to provide propulsion underwater.

Suborder: Mysticeti
Family: Balaenopteridae
Subfamily: Balaenopterinae
Genus: Balaenoptera
 Bryde's whale, Balaenoptera edeni DD
 Sei whale, Balaenoptera borealis EN
Subfamily: Megapterinae
Genus: Megaptera
 Humpback whale, Megaptera novaeangliae VU
Suborder: Odontoceti
Superfamily: Platanistoidea
Family: Physeteridae
Genus: Physeter
 Sperm whale, Physeter macrocephalus  VU
Family: Kogiidae
Genus: Kogia
 Dwarf sperm whale, Kogia sima LR/lc
Family: Ziphidae
Subfamily: Hyperoodontinae
Genus: Mesoplodon
 Blainville's beaked whale, Mesoplodon densirostris DD
Family: Delphinidae (marine dolphins)
Genus: Lagenodelphis
 Fraser's dolphin, Lagenodelphis hosei DD
Genus: Peponocephala
 Melon-headed whale, Peponocephala electra LR/lc
Genus: Feresa
 Pygmy killer whale, Feresa attenuata DD
Genus: Pseudorca
 False killer whale, Pseudorca crassidens LR/lc
Genus: Globicephala
 Pilot whale, Globicephala macrorhynchus LR/cd
Genus: Orcinus
 Orca, Orcinus orca LR/cd

Notes

References

See also
List of chordate orders
Lists of mammals by region
List of prehistoric mammals
Mammal classification
List of mammals described in the 2000s

Northern Mariana Islands
mammals
Northern Mariana Islands
'|mammals